Zsolt Németh (born 14 December 1984) is a Hungarian politician, member of the National Assembly (MP) from the Jobbik's Baranya County Regional List between 2010 and 2014.

References

1984 births
Living people
University of Pécs alumni
Jobbik politicians
Members of the National Assembly of Hungary (2010–2014)
People from Pécs